The 1988 Southern Cross Classic was a women's tennis tournament played on outdoor hard courts in Adelaide in Australia and was part of Tier V of the 1989 WTA Tour. The tournament ran from 28 November through 4 December 1988. The winner of the Singles category was Jana Novotná from The Czech Republic and the winners of the Doubles category were Sylvia Hanika and Claudia Kohde-Kilsch from Germany.

Finals

Singles

 Jana Novotná defeated  Jana Pospíšilová 7–5, 6–4
 It was Novotná's 7th title of the year and the 11th of her career.

Doubles

 Sylvia Hanika /  Claudia Kohde-Kilsch defeated  Lori McNeil /  Jana Novotná 7–5, 6–7, 6–4
 It was Hanika's only title of the year and the 4th of her career. It was Kohde-Kilsch's 2nd title of the year and the 30th of her career.

Southern Cross Classic
Southern Cross Classic
Southern Cross Classic
Southern Cross Classic
Southern Cross Classic
Southern Cross Classic, 1988